"The Empty Chair" is a song recorded by English singer-songwriter Sting. Co-written by Sting and American record producer J. Ralph, the song was released as the lead single from the soundtrack album of 2016 documentary film Jim: The James Foley Story.

"The Empty Chair" was nominated for the 2017 Academy Award in the Best Original Song category. Both Sting and J. Ralph have previously received nominations in the same category; Sting was nominated three times before while J. Ralph had two previous nominations.

Sting recorded a separate version of the song with a guitar, instead of piano, for his studio album 57th & 9th.

Inspiration 
The song is written for the film Jim: The James Foley Story which tells the life story of American photojournalist James "Jim" Foley who was kidnapped in Syria and subsequently beheaded by Islamic State of Iraq and the Levant (ISIS). Sting, who wrote the song with J. Ralph, discussed the inspiration behind "The Empty Chair" during an interview with Billboard:

Live performances 
Sting performed a solo acoustic guitar version of "The Empty Chair" during the 89th Academy Awards ceremony aired live on February 26, 2017. Sting also sang the song in November 2016 at Bataclan, a theatre in Paris, in an exclusive concert to commemorate the 2015 terrorist attack.

References

External links
 "The Empty Chair" at Oscars.org 
 

2016 singles
2016 songs
Sting (musician)
Songs written by Sting (musician)
Commemoration songs